Jan Kubičík (born 19 January 1996) is a Czech snowboarder. He competed in the 2018 Winter Olympics.

References

1996 births
Living people
Snowboarders at the 2018 Winter Olympics
Czech male snowboarders
Olympic snowboarders of the Czech Republic
Sportspeople from Brno